Goyescas is a 1942 Spanish musical film directed by Benito Perojo and starring Imperio Argentina, Rafael Rivelles and Armando Calvo. The film is an adaptation of the 1916 zarzuela Goyescas by Enrique Granados, and also drew inspiration from the work of the artist Francisco Goya. The film was part of the popular trend for operetta films in Europe during the era. Perojo had been planning the production for around a decade before it was ultimately made.

The film received the Biennale Award at the 1942 Venice Film Festival.

Synopsis 
Set in Madrid, between the end of the 18th century and the beginning of the 19th. The Countess of Gualda and the famous songwriter Petrilla are very physically similar, so much so that many people confuse them. But one day they discover that they love the same man, the Marquis of Nuévalos, a terrible rivalry will arise between them that they will resolve based on songs and episodes that recreate Goya's paintings.

Cast
 Imperio Argentina as Petrilla / Condesa de Gualda 
 Rafael Rivelles as Fernando Pizarro 
 Armando Calvo as Luis Alfonso de Nuévalos 
 Manolo Morán as Dueño del mesón 
 Marta Flores as Pepa, La Gitana 
 Juan Calvo as Bandido 1 
 Xan das Bolas as Miguel 
 Ramón Martori as Corregidor 
 Antonio Casas as Paquiro 
 José Latorre as Ministro 
 Manuel Requena as Ventero 
 Eloísa Muro as Reina 
 María Vera as Maja 
 Marina Torres as Doncella de la condesa 
 Antonio Bayón as Bandido 2 
 Carmen Ponce de León as Mujer

References

Bibliography
 Bentley, Bernard. A Companion to Spanish Cinema. Boydell & Brewer 2008.

External links 

1942 films
Spanish musical drama films
Spanish historical musical films
1940s musical drama films
1940s historical musical films
1940s Spanish-language films
Films directed by Benito Perojo
Films set in Madrid
Films set in the 18th century
Operetta films
Cultural depictions of Francisco Goya
Spanish black-and-white films
1942 drama films
1940s Spanish films